Parking Space is a 1933 American Pre-Code short animated film by Walter Lantz Productions, starring Oswald the Lucky Rabbit. It is the 77th Oswald film created during the Lantz era and the 128th to feature the character.

Plot
Oswald runs a shop where commuters leave their young children to be watched by him while they have to be someplace else separately. One day, a lady collie comes to drop someone at the shop. Her submitted child is none other than the boy beagle.

The boy beagle feels unsure of the place he's in. He then goes to interact with the other youngsters, particularly a girl gibbon. Because the girl gibbon is often glum, he gives her a couple of milk bottles. To entertain her and everybody else there, the boy beagle encourages them to dance. The girl gibbon dances very joyously and therefore accelerates her movements. She dances so fast that the floor she is standing on ignites. A fire started forming on the floors. The fire in the short was not in animation, it is a clip of real fire from the fireplace. Meanwhile, outside, the children's guardians gathered as it is time to pick them up.

When Oswald reenters the shop, he is shocked to see the interior ablaze. He is able to salvage most of the children from the burning place using a vacuum cleaner. But while he saves them, Oswald succumbs to the smoky atmosphere and collapses. The boy beagle comes to his rescue, and uses the vacuum to pull him out. The little dog then exits the place in the same way.

The vacuum bag somehow makes its way outdoors where it bursts, thus releasing Oswald and the youngsters. The guardians pick up their children, and walk away happy. Oswald is greeted again by the lady collie who commends him for his heroic deed. The boy beagle later tries to interrupt Oswald but got kicked by the heel of Oswald's foot.

References

External links
Parking Space at the Big Cartoon Database

1933 films
1933 animated films
1930s American animated films
1930s animated short films
Walter Lantz Productions shorts
American black-and-white films
Oswald the Lucky Rabbit cartoons
American disaster films
Universal Pictures short films
Universal Pictures animated short films
Animated films about animals